The Lăpușnic is a right tributary of the river Nera in Romania. It discharges into the Nera near Lăpușnicu Mare.

References

Rivers of Romania
Rivers of Caraș-Severin County